Blanche of France may refer to:

Blanche of Castile (1188–1252), queen of Louis VIII of France
Blanche of France (1253–1323), daughter of Louis IX of France and Margaret of Provence; wife of Ferdinand de la Cerda; Blanche of France, Infanta of Castile
Blanche of France (1282–1305), daughter of Philip III of France and Marie of Brabant, Queen of France; wife of Rudolph I of Bohemia; Blanche of France, Duchess of Austria
Blanche of France (daughter of Philip IV)
Blanche of France (nun) (1313–1358), daughter of Philip V of France and Joan II of Burgundy
Blanche of France, Duchess of Orléans (1328–1393), daughter of Charles IV of France and Jeanne d'Évreux; wife of Philip of Valois, Duke of Orléans